Jispa (elevation 3,200 m or 10,500 ft; population 202) is a village in Lahaul, in the Indian state of Himachal Pradesh.

Geography 
There are approximately 20 villages between Jispa and Keylong.

Demographics 
According to the 2011 census, of the town's 202 residents, 113 were male and 89 were female.  One belonged to scheduled castes, and 177 belonged to scheduled tribes.  The village had 51 households.

Amenities 
The village has a helipad, a post office, and a monastery. Travellers often stop for the night here; the village has a hotel, a mountaineers' hut, and a campground. Jispa also has a small folk museum.

References 

Cities and towns in Lahaul and Spiti district